Air Marshal Sir Peter Guy Wykeham,  (born Wykeham-Barnes; 13 September 1915 – 23 February 1995) was a Royal Air Force fighter pilot and squadron commander, and a flying ace of the Second World War. He was credited with 14 and 3 shared aerial victories.

RAF career
Wykeham-Barnes joined the Royal Air Force as an apprentice in 1932. He served in the Second World War as a Flight Commander with No. 274 Squadron and as Officer Commanding No. 73 Squadron before commanding the fighters at Headquarters Desert Air Force. He continued his war service as Officer Commanding No. 257 Squadron and then as Officer Commanding No. 23 Squadron before becoming Sector Commander at RAF Kenley and then commanding No. 140 Wing.

Remaining in the RAF after the War, Wykeham-Barnes was employed as a test pilot before serving with the USAF Fifth Air Force in the Korean War. On his return to Great Britain, Wykeham-Barnes served as station commander at RAF North Weald and then RAF Wattisham before becoming Assistant Chief of Staff (Operations) at Headquarters Allied Air Forces Central Europe in 1953. He went on to join the Air Staff (Operations) at Headquarters RAF Fighter Command in 1956 and became Director of Fighter & Theatre Air Force Operations in 1958. He served as Air Officer Commanding No. 38 Group from 1960, the Director of the Joint Warfare Staff from 1962, the Commander of the Far East Air Force from 1964 and the Deputy Chief of the Air Staff from 1967 before retiring in 1969.

Published works
Wykeham is the author of a history of Fighter Command (Fighter Command. A Study of Air Defence 1914–1960) published in 1960 and a biography of Alberto Santos-Dumont, published in 1962.

Family
In 1949 Wykeham married Barbara Priestley; they had two sons and one daughter.

References

|-

1915 births
1995 deaths
British World War II flying aces
Companions of the Distinguished Service Order
Knights Commander of the Order of the Bath
Officers of the Order of the British Empire
People educated at Hampton School
Recipients of the Air Force Cross (United Kingdom)
Recipients of the Air Medal
Recipients of the Distinguished Flying Cross (United Kingdom)
Royal Air Force air marshals
Royal Air Force personnel of the Korean War
Royal Air Force personnel of World War II